is a Japanese fashion designer based in Tokyo and Paris. Considered a master tailor alongside those such as Madeleine Vionnet, he is known for his avant-garde tailoring featuring Japanese design aesthetics.

Yamamoto has won notable awards for his contributions to fashion, including the Chevalier/Officier/Commandeur of Ordre des Arts et des Lettres, Medal of Honor with Purple Ribbon, the Ordre national du Mérite, the Royal Designer for Industry and the Master of Design award by Fashion Group International.

Early life
Born in Tokyo, Yamamoto graduated from Keio University with a degree in law in 1966. He gave up a prospective legal career to assist his mother in her dressmaking business, from where he learned his tailoring skills. He further studied fashion design at Bunka Fashion College, getting a degree in 1969.

Career
Yamamoto debuted in Tokyo in 1977, followed by two more shows; a debut in Paris in 1981 and in New York in 1982. His first collection under the label Y's, focused on a collection for women that reflected typical men's garments, with clothes cut in uncluttered shapes with washed fabrics and dark colors. In an interview with The New York Times in 1983, Yamamoto said of his designs, "I think that my men's clothes look as good on women as my women's clothing […] When I started designing, I wanted to make men's clothes for women." More recently he has expounded: "When I started making clothes for my line Y's in 1977, all I wanted was for women to wear men's clothes. I jumped on the idea of designing coats for women. It meant something to me – the idea of a coat guarding and hiding a woman's body. I wanted to protect the woman's body from something – maybe from men's eyes or a cold wind."

His commercially successful main line, Yohji Yamamoto (women/men) and Y's, are especially popular in Tokyo. These two lines are also available at his flagship stores in Paris and Antwerp, and at high-end department stores worldwide. Other principal lines include Pour Homme, Costume d'Homme, and the diffusion line Coming Soon. Yohji Yamamoto Inc. reported in 2007 that the sales of Yamamoto's two main lines average above $100 million annually.

Yamamoto is known for an avant-garde spirit in his clothing, frequently creating designs far removed from current trends. His signature oversized silhouettes often feature drapery in varying textures. Yohji' collections are predominately made in black, a colour which Yamamoto has described as "modest and arrogant at the same time. Black is lazy and easy – but mysterious. But above all black says this: "I don't bother you – don't bother me"."

Poor decisions by finance managers pushed the brand into debts of more than US$65 million in 2009, which angered Yamamoto and led to a company restructuring from 2009 to 2010. The private equity firm Integral Corp was identified as the Japanese company who will restructure the Yohji Yamamoto Inc and by November 2010 the company was out of debt and avoiding the risk of bankruptcy.

Fashion advocacy
In 2008, the Yohji Yamamoto Fund for Peace was established to foster development of China's fashion industry and to help heal the long-standing enmity between China and Japan. Each year, an emerging Chinese designer will be awarded with a two-year scholarship to a fashion college in Japan or Europe, and a male or female Chinese fashion model will be selected to make a runway debut during the Paris prêt-à-porter season.

Yamamoto has been quoted as saying: "they must have so many angry young people. Being a fashion designer or an artist, you have to be angry."  Of the fashion show he staged in Beijing in spring 2008 to launch this initiative, Yamamoto said, "It's not political. I am going to open a store here, then Chinese people will come and shop there, and then they are happy. The real art is making people happy, but also asking questions about society."

Brand identity 
Yamamoto's designs recall Japanese drawing techniques. 

His technique consists of wide cuts, exotic and luxurious materials and elaborate handicrafts. The designer endeavors to make his clothes from the back and not from the front. He favors dark colors.

Chronology 

1972: Founded Y's joint stock corporation
1977: Tokyo collection debut
1981: Pret a porter collection debut in Paris. Yohji Yamamoto line started at the same time.
1993: Designed costumes for the Heiner Müller & Daniel Barenboim production of Richard Wagner's opera Tristan und Isolde at The Bayreuth Festival
1984: Yohji Yamamoto joint stock corporation founded
1996: Designed alongside Red or Dead founders Wayne and Gerardine Hemingway MBE
2002: Haute couture collection presented in Paris. Relationship formed with exclusive Parisian boutiques
2003: Opening of the Y's line flagship store in Roppongi Hills
2003: Y-3 line and collection debut
2011: Exhibition at the Victoria and Albert Museum in London
2014: Designs third kits for the football club Real Madrid
2019: Designs the All Blacks jerseys for the 2019 Rugby World Cup
2022: Designed a special alternate all-black uniform set for the Yomiuri Giants that was played from September 6-8 against the Yokohama DeNA BayStars

Awards 
 : Ordre des Arts et des Lettres / Chevalier, 1994
 : Medals of Honor / Medal with Purple Ribbon, 2004
 : Japan brand development (contributed corporation) award from METI, 2005
 : Ordre des Arts et des Lettres / Officier, 2005
 : Ordre des Arts et des Lettres / Commandeur, 2011

Filmography
 Notebook on Cities and Clothes (1989) by Wim Wenders
 Brother (2000) by Kitano Takeshi
 Dolls (2002) by Kitano Takeshi
 Wagner: Tristan und Isolde (2008) by Heiner Müller 
 Yohji Yamamoto: This is My Dream (2011) by Theo Stanley

References

  "Yoji Yamamoto,"Women's Wear Daily.

External links

 Yohji Yamamoto Official Site
 

Keio University alumni
Clothing brands of Japan
High fashion brands
Japanese fashion designers
Japanese brands
Shoe brands
1943 births
Articles containing video clips
Living people
Artists from Tokyo
Adidas people